The Marquess of Trelissick (also called Marquis of Trelessick) is a title in the Jacobite Peerage of England. It was the only non-subsidiary title at the rank of Marquess in the English Jacobite Peerage, before becoming a subsidiary of the Duke of Tyrconnell. It was awarded to James Paynter (1666 - ?), a leading Jacobite, who played a prominent role in the Jacobite uprising in Cornwall.

In 1715 he was active in proclaiming James Francis Edward Stuart (the Old Pretender) on the death of Queen Anne. For this, he was tried at Launceston, but acquitted, and welcomed by "bonfire and by ball" from there to Land's End. For his commitment, he was created Marquess of Trelissick in the Jacobite Peerage of England, on 20 June 1715.

It was well documented that James Paynter died without issue, and it was believed that the title was extinct; but, as no mention can be found of restriction of the title to "heirs-male of his body", the title was (and is) inheritable by other lines of the family, and through the female line, as "heirs-general". The title would therefore pass to his brother, William (born about 1661), though William's line did not assume the title.

The title was reassumed by William Paynter's heir-general and 8th great-grandson, Edward Bourke. He also holds the Jacobite Peerage of Baron Bourke, as heir-male, and Duke of Tyrconnell, as direct heir-general.

References

Year of birth missing (living people)
Marquessates in the Jacobite Peerage